Caroline Langat Thoruwa is a Kenyan chemist. She is a professor of chemistry at Kenyatta University, and the director of its Nairobi City satellite campus.

Langat Thoruwa is also the chairperson of African Women in Science and Engineering, a member of the board of the International Network Women Engineers & Scientists, and a member of the technical committee of ACTIL Knowledge Hub.

References

Year of birth missing (living people)
Living people
Kenyan chemists
Kenyan women chemists
21st-century chemists
21st-century women scientists